Scandal is an American political thriller television series created by Shonda Rhimes, that ran on ABC from April 5, 2012 until April 19, 2018.

Kerry Washington stars as Olivia Pope, a former White House Communications Director who leaves to start her own crisis management firm, Pope and Associates, where she works to keep the secrets and protect the public images of the country's most powerful and elite. On staff at the new firm are fresh-faced lawyer Quinn Perkins (Katie Lowes); smooth talking litigator Harrison Wright (Columbus Short); investigator Abby Whelan (Darby Stanchfield); and computer hacker with a CIA past Huck (Guillermo Diaz). The show also focuses on President of the United States Fitzgerald Grant (Tony Goldwyn); First Lady Mellie Grant (Bellamy Young); White House Chief of Staff Cyrus Beene (Jeff Perry); Vice President and eventual presidential candidate Sally Langston (Kate Burton); U.S. Attorney David Rosen (Joshua Malina); Head of NSA, Jake Ballard (Scott Foley); chairwoman Elizabeth North (Portia de Rossi); activist Marcus Walker (Cornelius Smith Jr.); and head of B613 Eli Pope (Joe Morton).

Series overview

Episodes

Season 1 (2012)

Season 2 (2012–13)

Season 3 (2013–14)

Season 4 (2014–15)

Season 5 (2015–16)

Season 6 (2017)

Season 7 (2017–18)

Specials

Webisodes

Gladiator Wanted 
A web series debuted prior to the sixth-season premiere and features Guillermo Diaz as Huck, Katie Lowes as Quinn, Cornelius Smith Jr. as Marcus and George Newbern as Charlie. All of the episodes were directed by Darby Stanchfield, who portrays Abby in the show.

Ratings

References

External links 

Lists of American drama television series episodes